The Golden Gate Yacht Club (GGYC) is a San Francisco, California, U.S. based yacht club founded in 1939.

History
In 1939 the first members built a clubhouse on a barge in the San Francisco Marina. After the 1989 Loma Prieta earthquake severely damaged the club, members pulled together and rebuilt it.

GGYC is a popular cruise and regatta venue on the San Francisco waterfront. The Club is located on the jetty directly east of the St. Francis Yacht Club and north of the Marina Green, at the end of Yacht Road in San Francisco. The most well-known of current members is Oracle Corporation founder Larry Ellison.

The Club entered the 2007 Louis Vuitton Cup, the America's Cup challenger selection series, represented by the BMW Oracle Racing team. BMW Oracle Racing were eliminated in the semi-finals. They challenged for the America's Cup in 2010 represented by the BMW Oracle Racing team and won a Deed of Gift match 2–0 against the Alinghi team representing Société Nautique de Genève becoming the first American yacht club to hold the cup since 1995.

America's Cup Management announced on July 5, 2007 that the protocol for the 33rd America's Cup had been agreed between the Defending yacht club, the Société Nautique de Genève (SNG) of Switzerland and its Challenger of Record, the Club Náutico Español de Vela of Spain. Golden Gate Yacht Club sued, successfully arguing that Club Náutico Español de Vela was not a valid challenger. The challenge was upheld, and Golden Gate Yacht Club's team, BMW Oracle Racing, sailed against SNG, represented by the Alinghi team, in February 2010 in Valencia, Spain. The competing boats, Alinghi 5 and USA 17 were both 90-foot multihulls. The rigid wing sail of USA 17 provided a decisive advantage and Golden Gate Yacht Club won the 2010 America's Cup by a considerable margin.

They successfully defended the America's Cup at the 34th America's Cup in San Francisco in 2013, but finally lost the trophy in the 35th edition against the Royal New Zealand Yacht Squadron.

Commodores
To date there have been 64 commodores of the Golden Gate Yacht Club.

See also
America's Cup winning yacht clubs
 Royal Yacht Squadron (donating club for the Cup)
 New York Yacht Club (Deed of Gift title club)
 San Diego Yacht Club (home base of Team Dennis Conner)
 Société Nautique de Genève (first Europeans to hold the Cup since the RYS lost it)
 Royal New Zealand Yacht Squadron (multiple time non-consecutive vanquisher of U.S. clubs)
 Royal Perth Yacht Club (first club to defeat the NYYC)

References

Further reading

External links
 Official website: http://ggyc.com/ 

1939 establishments in California
Golden Gate Yacht Club